In computer science, a linear graph grammar (also a connection graph reduction system or a port graph grammar) is a class of graph grammar on which nodes have a number of ports connected together by edges and edges connect exactly two ports together.  Interaction nets are a special subclass of linear graph grammars in which rewriting is confluent.

Implementations
Bawden introduces linear graphs in the context of a compiler for a fragment of the Scheme programming language.  Bawden and Mairson (1998) describe the design of a distributed implementation in which the linear graph is spread across many computing nodes and may freely migrate in order to make rewrites possible.

Notes

References
Bawden, Alan (1986), Connection graphs, In Proceedings of the 1986 ACM conference on LISP and functional programming, pp. 258–265, ACM Press.
Bawden, Alan (1992), Linear graph reduction: confronting the cost of naming, PhD dissertation, MIT.
Bawden, Alan (1993), Implementing Distributed Systems Using Linear Naming, A.I. Technical Report No. 1627, MIT.
Bawden and Mairson (1998), Linear naming: experimental software for optimizing communication protocols, Working paper #1, Dept. Computer Science, Brandeis University.

Graph rewriting